The csikós is the mounted horse-herdsman of Hungary. The csikós tradition is closely associated with the Hungarian puszta, in recent times particularly in the environs of Debrecen and Hortobágy National Park. It is also closely linked to the Nonius breed of horse, for which one of the two principal breeding centres is the Máta Stud, some 3 kilometres from Hortobágy.

Images

See also
Betyárs
Hajduk (soldiers)

References 

Animal husbandry occupations
Horse-related professions and professionals